Angie Marino (born March 27, 1990) is an American Freestyle BMX cyclist.

She grew up in Buffalo, New York although she now resides in San Diego. She picked up her first BMX when her older brother was interested and she quickly began racing. By age 15, she made the switch to Freestyle BMX. Marino won bronze at the 2017 UCI Urban Cycling World Championships, and in 2018 she would podium again at the same event. She was named by ESPN as one of the top 50 Female Athletes in Action Sports, named 17th in ESPN’s X Games Most Unstoppable Women in action sports, and featured ons bike doing stunts in the 2016 film Bad Moms.

She created The Bloom BMX website with fellow pro rider Beatrice Trang to promote BMX for girls.

References

External links
 
 Angie Marino at Vans BMX Team
 
 

1990 births
Living people
BMX riders
American female cyclists
Sportspeople from Buffalo, New York
21st-century American women